Princess Indrasakdi Sachi (RTGS: Inthrasak Sachi), formerly Queen Indrasakdi Sachi (10 June 1902 – 30 November 1975), née Praphai Sucharitakul (RTGS: Praphai Sucharitakun), was a royal consort of King Vajiravudh (Rama VI) of Siam. She was one of the daughters of Chao Praya Sudharm Montri, the younger sister of Pra Sucharit Suda. The name means "Sachi, wife of Indra".

She became Queen because of her pregnancy, making King Vajiravudh extremely happy with a much anticipated heir. It was never to be, as the Queen miscarried five or six times during her queenship. She was later demoted to the rank of Princess Consort.

Titles and styles

 10 June 1902 - 12 January 1921 : Praphai Sucharitakul
 12 January 1921 - 10 June 1922 : Lady Indranee (Phra Indranee)
 10 June 1922 - 1 January 1923 : Her Royal Highness Princess Indrasakdi Sachi, The Royal Consort (Phra Vara RaJaChaya Thoe Phra Indrasakdi Sachi)
 1 January 1923 - 15 September 1925 : Her Majesty The Queen (Somdet Phra Nang Chao Indrasakdi Sachi Phra Boromma Rajini)
 15 September 1925 - 30 November 1975 : Her Royal Highness Princess Indrasakdi Sachi, The Princess Consort (Somdet Phra Nang Chao Indrasakdi Sachi Phra Vara RaJaChaya)

Ancestors

References
 
 www.soravij.com 

|-

1902 births
1975 deaths
20th-century Thai women
20th-century Chakri dynasty
Thai princesses consort
Ratana Varabhorn Order of Merit
Dames Grand Cross of the Order of Chula Chom Klao
Princesses by marriage